Mikhail Vladimirovich Semyonov (October 18, 1933 — November 9, 2006) was a Russian basketball player born in Rostov-na-Donu, Rostov, Russia. As a member of the Soviet Union national basketball team he competed at  the 1956 and 1960 Olympics, winning two silver medals.

References

1933 births
2006 deaths
Basketball players at the 1956 Summer Olympics
Basketball players at the 1960 Summer Olympics
Olympic basketball players of the Soviet Union
Olympic medalists in basketball
Olympic silver medalists for the Soviet Union
Russian men's basketball players
Soviet men's basketball players
1959 FIBA World Championship players
Medalists at the 1960 Summer Olympics
Medalists at the 1956 Summer Olympics